Stenocarpus acacioides is a species of flowering plant in the family Proteaceae and is endemic to north-western Australia. It is a shrub or tree with elliptic leaves and groups of white flowers and woody, linear follicles.

Description
Juvenile leaves are egg-shaped, longer and wider than adult leaves.

Taxonomy
Stenocarpus acacioides was first formally described in 1859 by Ferdinand von Mueller in Fragmenta Phytographiae Australiae from specimens collected near the Roper River. The specific epithet (acacioides) means "Acacia-like".

Distribution and habitat
This species usually grows in woodland and occurs from the Kimberley region of Western Australia to the northern parts of the Northern Territory.

References

Flora of Western Australia
Flora of the Northern Territory
acacioides
Plants described in 1859
Taxa named by Ferdinand von Mueller